Fifine at the Fair is a poem in Alexandrine couplets by Robert Browning, published in 1872.

Analysis

Prologue 
In the prologue, the poet compares himself to the swimmer who exchanges the solid earth for the free medium of the sea, and, while he floats and meditates, sees above him a glorious butterfly, which has likewise changed its sphere of life from that of a worm on the ground to a denizen of the air. By a natural transition he extends the comparison to a departed soul, freed from the trammels of terrestrial life and transferred to a more elevated existence. In speculating, however, upon those mutations, he professes that he "both lives and likes life's way". Substituting poetry for heaven, he apostrophises a soul which has heaven for its home. He concludes by asking—

In those concluding words he intimates that, amidst his poetical flights, he always keeps practical ends in view; and that the ruling subject of his contemplations is the discovery and development of truth.

Love and Desire 

The introductory if not the chief object of the production is to contrast two very widely separated orders of society with reference to the degree of happiness enjoyed by each. Visiting a fair at Pornic, in Brittany, he is led into a train of reverie from witnessing the antics of a company of strollers. He contrasts the vagabond but free life of people who gain their livelihood by wandering from fair to fair, exhibiting their performances to their unsophisticated auditors, and exciting their curiosity by the marvels which they present to them, with, on the other hand, the life of the retired and stationary members of society, who live out of the glare of that unreserved and careless career. The author takes Fifine, the queen of a company of itinerant showmen, as the representative of the former of those classes; and his supposed wife, Elvire, as the type of the other. While exposing the sordid accompaniments of the life passed in the open air, with all its domesticities under the public gaze of a crowd of gaping rustics, he confesses himself somewhat fascinated by the personal charms of Fifine, and her demonstrative display of them; and is led to meditate on what can be the attractions of that kind of life and its almost unrestricted liberty.

Elvire, the poet's wife, is pressed by him to look on at the scenes and actors in the Breton fair. He details to her the squalid realities of both, and the tinselled devices by which the gaudy show is prepared. Confessing an inward sympathy with the reckless freedom of the histrionic strollers, he strives to trace the source of the merry insouciance which seems to make up to them for the loss of what some judge the higher joys and advantages of the civilised society from which they are excluded; and dreams that there may be some germ of goodness and enjoyment yet remaining for man in the things rejected by social conventions. Whatever those attractions of a precarious and erratic life may be, they have at least allured the class of mountebanks to despise what others hold most in honour, and to prefer purchasing the sweets of their degraded life by the privations which accompany it, rather than to accept the civilised state and submit to its restraints. Taking Fifine as a prominent type of her class, after a glowing eulogium of her physical charms, and a tribute to the higher worth of nobler women, he enumerates the attractive qualities of some famous dames, placing Fifine and Elvire side by side at the close. He pleads the common innocence of the infancy of both, and argues that, widely as their paths have diverged since then, even Fifine herself may have some noble disinterestedness in the motives to her occupation, and, in her case, 

He generalises the principle that every detail in creation has possessed, or does or will possess, in some particular feature, under some fit concurrence of circumstances, a supreme and exclusive excellence. So with Fifine: she may have some estimable qualities latent. At least her traffic consists only in the display of external grace: she does not, like Helen, offer the prize of queenly beauty; nor, like the voluptuous Cleopatra, make a parade of sensual allurements. The poet deprecates Elvire's jealousy from his praise of Fifine and momentary neglect of herself, by the illustration of his purchasing a "Rafael" at a great price, its suspension in the most honoured place in his gallery, and yet his seeming loss of interest in it, although it is a certainty that he would risk his life without hesitation to preserve it from the flames. Similarly strong is his unobtrusive love for Elvire. In continuation of this comparison, he proceeds to account for his enduring love for her, in reply to her objection that whatever of personal beauty she may originally have had has suffered from time. It is in his mind that her true picture is. Wherever the original type of her beauty has been impaired, he supplements unloveliness by love, and

The poet copiously exemplifies this process of mental reconstruction and restoration by supposing portraits roughly outlined in the sand, and afterwards as roughly amended until they suggest a likeness. So the mind restores for itself what is lost in the lineaments which first created love and sympathy in the soul. Similarly an unfinished or mutilated fragment of sculpture, chiselled by a master's hand, reveals to a connoisseur the intention of the artist, and brings to life again the impaired beauties of his conception. So the memory and the fancy restore the original form and expression of the face by the magic power of love, and of that instinctive artistic reproductive power which still "evokes the beautiful".

Thus souls supplement each other; and thus are restored to the statue, the picture, or the fare, forms and expressions which have been defaced or weakened by the lapse and wear of time. The poet

Man and Woman 
In the course of his subsequent conversation with Elvire, after having explained the transient nature of his fancies respecting Fifine, he enters upon subtle disquisitions on the influence of soul upon soul, and on the distinct modes of dealing with man and woman—he treats the sexes separately in this respect—with the view of invigorating them in their struggles after truth. In the inculcation of truth, or when wishing to "lead, instruct, and benefit", the moral teacher must descend in order to conciliate and manage the masculine mind—

This is to avoid wounding the self-esteem of the disciple; but his mode of treating woman is less indirect and Socratic—

Woman is proud to act as the auxiliary to the man she loves or esteems. In this the poet compares women to dolphins in the classical fable of Arion. The whole passage consistutes a eulogium on woman—

Arts and Sciences 
In several other passages the poet makes use of his rich store of classical reminiscences. Contemplating the sea, he felicitously translates from a celebrated ode of Horace—

In a passage in which the author eulogises music, and in particular Schumann's Carnival, he detects a peculiar advantage of musical composition, realised by its creating an indestructible "record" of feelings which would otherwise perish on their first conception—evanescent as the vibrations that issued from the instrument which gave them utterance.

Besides the more important passages, the author's work is replete with little fancies. For example, in discoursing on the undisguised fiction of the drama, he contrasts its confessed illusions with the real hypocrisy and deception practised in social intercourse—

Ridiculing what he considers the preposterous theory of the primitive voluntary development of rudimental organic members from the animals' desires and efforts to possess certain faculties, he ironically lays down that—

A vision of a Venetian fair and its crowd of grotesque masqueraders gives the author an opportunity of passing under vivid review an array of passions, loves, and hates, symbolised by the various costumes and enlivened by his versatile power of describing the moods of the mind. An example is this picture of sunset—

Meaning and Morality 

Browning's object seems to be the inculcation of the truth that unmixed and unmitigated evil scarcely exists in the world. Shakespeare lays down the principle that "there is a seed of goodness in things evil"; and the poet's conceptions are also in harmony with the biblical doctrine that the wicked are the instruments in God's hands for working out the ultimate good intended by Him.

The structure and general tone of the poem irresistibly suggest to the reader that it is in some measure intended as the tribute of the poet to the memory of the wife of whom he had been bereaved. To Elvire, throughout the poem, is attributed every endearing quality that can characterise a woman—such as her gentle modification of her husband's bold and comprehensive views of human nature; her easily-disarmed resentment when another's image seems for a moment to supersede her own in his heart; her mild but cogent influence in elevating his thoughts to the loftiest truths; her grace, her truthfulness, and her unswerving love. There is, however, a visionary mistiness attendant upon her personality in the poem, although the fervour of the poet's sentiments in relation to her argues that her appearance and presence with him were not "all a dream". At the close of the poem the shadowy disguise is removed, when, after their long rambling, they return to a home of anticipated happiness. He suddenly exclaims at the threshold, in language which pathetically foreshadows her death—

Epilogue 
The epilogue confirms the conjecture. It is also darkly suggestive of subsequent sinister events. In the poet's desolation the shade of his lost Elvire revisits hire, and the poem closes with her final words—

References

Sources 

 Birch, Dinah, ed. (2009). "Fifine at the Fair". In The Oxford Companion to English Literature. 7th ed. Oxford University Press.
 Browning, Robert (1872). Fifine at the Fair. London: Smith, Elder & Co. pp. i–xii, 1–171.
 Orr, Sutherland (1891). Life and Letters of Robert Browning. Vol. 2. Boston and New York: Houghton, Mifflin and Company. pp. 428–434, 494–495, 569–570. 
 Raymond, William O. (1934). "Browning's Dark Mood: A Study of "Fifine at the Fair"". Studies in Philology, 31(4): pp. 578–599.
 Watkins, Charlotte Crawford (1959). "The "Abstruser Themes" of Browning's Fifine at the Fair". PMLA, 74(4): pp. 426–437.
 Whitla, W. (1968). "Browning's 'Fifine at the Fair': Its Social, Literary and Biographical Background, With a Criticism of the Poem". Thesis (Ph.D.). University of Oxford.

Reviews 

 "London, Saturday, June 8". The Daily Telegraph. Saturday, 8 June 1872. p. 5.
 "Literary. Fifine at the Fair". The Examiner. Saturday, 15 June 1872. pp. 600–601.
 "Mr. Browning's New Poem". The Manchester Guardian. Friday, 28 June 1872. p. 7.                 
 "Literary Notice. Fifine at the Fair". The Liverpool Mercury. Tuesday, 20 August 1872. p. 8. 
 "Literature. Fifine at the Fair". The Morning Post. Tuesday, 20 August 1872. p. 3.

External links 

 "Fifine at the Fair". Telelib. Accessed 18 July 2022.

Poetry by Robert Browning
1872 poems
1872 books